The Pavia–Alessandria railway is a railway line in Italy.

History 
The line was opened in 1862. Between Torreberetti and Alessandria it uses the Novara–Alessandria railway, opened in 1854.

See also 
 List of railway lines in Italy

References

Footnotes

Sources

External links 

Railway lines in Lombardy
Railway lines in Piedmont
Railway lines opened in 1862
1862 establishments in Italy